Denis Vladimirovich Popov (born 29 August 2002) is a Russian footballer who plays as a goalkeeper for Peresvet Domodedovo.

Club career
He made his debut in the Russian Premier League for Rostov on 19 June 2020 in a game against Sochi. Rostov were forced to field their Under-18 squad in that game as their main squad was quarantined after 6 players tested positive for COVID-19. Despite allowing ten goals in a 10–1 away defeat, he was selected Player of the Match, as he made 15 saves (setting the Russian Premier League record) including a saved penalty kick.

On 15 December 2020, Popov announced that he left Rostov.

References

External links
 
 
 

2002 births
Living people
Russian footballers
Association football goalkeepers
FC Rostov players
Valmieras FK players
Russian Premier League players
Russian expatriate footballers
Expatriate footballers in Latvia
Russian expatriate sportspeople in Latvia